John Brown (c. 1801 – 17 August 1879, Adelaide) was English colonist from London involved in the establishment of the British colony of South Australia.

John was the son of Samuel Brown and Maria Josepha Robinson. He was educated for three years at Mill Hill School and subsequently became a vintner at St Mary-at-Hill. However, after his business failed he became interested in plans to colonise South Australia. He worked with both Thomas Binney and Barzillai Quaife on distinct plans to create the colony on dissenting principles. He provided the South Australian Association with £200 and worked with Richard Hanson on the land report for the South Australian Colonization Commission and with Edward Gibbon Wakefield in preparing information  for the select committee as regards the disposal of waste land.

He worked as immigration agent and as editor of the Southern Australian, South Australia's second newspaper.

References

English emigrants to colonial Australia
1800s births
1879 deaths
Year of birth uncertain